Edward Taylor Felton (born 12 November 1907; died 1970) was an English footballer who played for Carlisle United, Darlington, Wigan Athletic, Huddersfield Town and Gateshead.

Career
Felton joined Wigan Athletic in 1933. He finished his first season at the club as top scorer, with 36 goals in all competitions. He scored 75 times in 113 Cheshire League appearances before joining Huddersfield Town during the 1935–36 season.

References

External links

1907 births
1970 deaths
Footballers from Gateshead
English footballers
Association football forwards
Carlisle United F.C. players
Darlington F.C. players
Wigan Athletic F.C. players
Huddersfield Town A.F.C. players
Gateshead F.C. players